The Tacoma Daisies were a Minor League Baseball team that played in the Pacific Northwest League. They were based in Tacoma, Washington and played in Tacoma Baseball Park. In July 1890, the Daisies agreed to allow Sunday games because of poor attendance.

Year-by-year record

Notable players
Ed Cartwright
Clark Griffith
Tom Parrott

References

Defunct minor league baseball teams
Professional baseball teams in Washington (state)
1890 establishments in Washington (state)
1892 disestablishments in Washington (state)
Baseball teams established in 1890
Baseball teams disestablished in 1892